Yuko Hosoki (born 12 November 1968) is a Japanese former professional tennis player.

Hosoki had a best singles ranking of 167 in the world and won ten ITF doubles titles. 

Her best WTA Tour performance came at the 1996 China Open, where she reached the second round of the singles and was a losing doubles finalist, partnering Kazue Takuma. She also made the second round of the 1997 Danamon Open in Jakarta, where she had a first-round upset win over fifth seed and world No. 57, Annabel Ellwood.

WTA career finals

Doubles: 1 (0–1)

ITF Circuit finals

Singles: 2 (0–2)

Doubles: 16 (10–6)

References

External links
 
 

1968 births
Living people
People from Osaka
Sportspeople from Osaka
Japanese female tennis players
20th-century Japanese women
21st-century Japanese women